Dastgerd (also Romanized as Dastgerd and Dastgird; also known as Dasht Gerd) is a village in Momenabad Rural District, in the Central District of Sarbisheh County, South Khorasan Province, Iran. At the 2006 census, its population was 116, in 30 families.

References 

Populated places in Sarbisheh County